Kulmala is a Finnish surname. Notable people with the surname include:

 Rasmus Kulmala (born 1994), Finnish ice hockey player
 Rudy Frans Kulmala (born 1983), Finnish rapper known by his stage name Ruudolf

Finnish-language surnames
Surnames of Finnish origin